Ministry of the Colonies may refer to:

Government department or ministry with "colony" or a derivative in its name:

 France – Ministry of the Colonies
 Germany – Imperial Colonial Office
 Kingdom of Italy – Ministry of the Colonies, the ministry of the government of the Kingdom of Italy responsible for the government of the country's colonial possessions and the direction of their economies
 Japan – Ministry of Colonial Affairs
 Netherlands – Ministry of the Colonies
 Portugal – Ministry of the Colonies
 United Kingdom – Colonial Office

Similar government organizations without using the word "colony":

 France – Minister of the Overseas
 Portugal – Overseas Ministry
 Spain – Ministry of Overseas
 United States – Office of Insular Affairs

See also 
 Minister of the Colonies (disambiguation)

 
Colonialism